Jon Bakero may refer to:

 Jon Bakero (footballer, born 1971), Spanish retired footballer
 Jon Bakero (footballer, born 1996), Spanish footballer for Phoenix Rising FC